The Jackals is a 1967 DeLuxe Color Western film from 20th Century Fox filmed at Killarney Film Studios South Africa. A remake of 1948's Yellow Sky, it stars Vincent Price as a South African prospector named Oupa (grandpa) Decker and contract Fox star Robert Gunner. The film was the last directed by Robert D. Webb.

Plot summary

Gold miner (Vincent Price) and his granddaughter (Diana Ivarson) living in South Africa are besieged by a group of bank robbers, led by 'Stretch' Hawkins (Robert Gunner) for the prospectors' gold.

Cast
 Vincent Price as Oupa Decker, the Prospector
 Diana Ivarson as Wilhemina Adelaide 'Willie' Decker
 Robert Gunner as Roger 'Stretch' Hawkins
 Bob Courtney as Dandy
 Patrick Mynhardt as Gotz
 Bill Brewer as Stoffel
 John Whiteley as Marico

See also
List of American films of 1967
The Cape Town Affair

References

External links
 
The Jackals at Letterbox DVD

1967 films
1960s English-language films
English-language South African films
Films based on works by W. R. Burnett
Films directed by Robert D. Webb
1967 Western (genre) films
Films set in Africa
Films shot in South Africa
20th Century Fox films
Films shot in Australia
South African Western (genre) films
American Western (genre) films
1960s American films